The 2004 Colorado State Rams football team represented Colorado State University during the 2004 NCAA Division I-A football season. They played their home games at Hughes Stadium in Fort Collins, CO and were led by head coach Sonny Lubick.

Schedule

References

Colorado State
Colorado State Rams football seasons
Colorado State Rams football